The first USS Columbus was a ship in the Continental Navy. Built as a merchant ship at Philadelphia in 1774 as Sally, she was purchased from Willing, Morris & Co., for the Continental Navy in November 1775, Captain Abraham Whipple was given command.

Between 17 February and 8 April 1776, in company with the other ships of Commodore Esek Hopkins' squadron, Columbus took part in the expedition to New Providence, Bahamas, where the first Navy-Marine amphibious operation seized essential military supplies. On the return passage, the squadron captured the British schooner, Hawk, on 4 April, and brig Bolton on the 5th. On 6 April the squadron engaged . After three hours the action was broken off and Glasgow escaped, leaving her tender to be captured. Later in 1776 Columbus cruised off the New England coast taking five prizes.

Chased ashore on Point Judith, Rhode Island, 27 March 1778 by a British squadron, Columbus was stripped of her sails, most of her rigging, and other usable material by her crew before being abandoned. She was burned by the enemy.

Sources

Ships of the Continental Navy
Ships built in Philadelphia
Maritime incidents in 1778